Robert Niven may refer to:

 Robert Niven (English cricketer) (born 1948), English cricketer
 Robert Niven (New Zealand cricketer) (1859-1919), New Zealand cricketer
 Robert Niven (soldier) (1853-1921), American soldier